
The following is a list of episodes of Wait Wait... Don't Tell Me!, NPR's news panel game, that aired during 2010. All episodes, unless otherwise indicated, are hosted by Peter Sagal with announcer/scorekeeper Carl Kassell, and originated at Chicago's Chase Auditorium. Job titles and backgrounds of the guests reflect their status at the time of their appearance.

January

February

March

April

May

June

July

August

September

October

November

December

References

Wait Wait... Don't Tell Me!
Wait Wait Don't Tell Me
Wait Wait Don't Tell Me